Doncaster Central is a constituency represented in the House of Commons of the UK Parliament since 1997 by Dame Rosie Winterton of the Labour Party.  Since 2017, Winterton has served as one of three Deputy Speakers of the House; she is the second MP for the constituency to be a Deputy Speaker, after Harold Walker.

History and profile
Created in 1983, the seat covers most of the large Yorkshire town of Doncaster served by an international airport and the UK motorway network in the former Doncaster constituency. Although formerly considered a Labour stronghold, since 2019 the seat has become a marginal between Labour and the Conservatives.

Boundaries 

1983–2010: The Metropolitan Borough of Doncaster wards of Armthorpe, Balby, Bessacarr, Central, Intake, Town Field, and Wheatley.

2010–present: The Metropolitan Borough of Doncaster wards of Armthorpe, Balby, Bessacarr and Cantley, Central, Edenthorpe, Kirk Sandall and Barnby Dun, Town Moor, and Wheatley.

The constituency includes most of the town of Doncaster and neighbours the Doncaster North and Don Valley seats.

Members of Parliament

Elections

Elections in the 2010s

Elections in the 2000s

Elections in the 1990s

Elections in the 1980s

See also 
 List of parliamentary constituencies in South Yorkshire

Notes

References

Sources
Guardian Unlimited Politics (Election results from 1992 to the present)
Politicsresources.net - Official Web Site ✔  (Election results from 1951 to the present)

Politics of Doncaster
Parliamentary constituencies in Yorkshire and the Humber
Constituencies of the Parliament of the United Kingdom established in 1983